George Tunstal Redmayne, more usually G T Redmayne (1840 - 1912), was the youngest of four sons of Giles Redmayne and his wife, Margareta Robey. He was born in London and attended Tonbridge School for two years before being educated by private tutors. His father was a wealthy linen draper and silk mercer who owned a house in London and Brathay Hall in the Lake District where he employed architect Alfred Waterhouse in the mid-1850s. George Redmayne became Waterhouse's pupil in 1859 and remained with him as his assistant. He married Waterhouse's sister, Katherine, in 1870 and they had two sons, Martin, in 1871, and Leonard, in 1877. Redmayne died at his residence, Great Stoakley in Haselmere, in 1912.

Redmayne ran Waterhouse's Manchester office after Waterhouse opened another in London. He started an independent practice in Manchester in the late 1860s and in 1869 had an office in the Royal Insurance Buildings in King Street. He continued to practice in Manchester until 1894 when he moved to Surrey. Waterhouse proposed him as an Associate of the Royal Institute of British Architects (RIBA) in 1872 and as a fellow in 1877. He was President of Manchester Society of Architects in 1886.

Among his commissions in Manchester were the Neo-Gothic St Andrew's Chambers on the corner of Albert Square built in 1874 for Scottish Widows Life Assurance Society and the Manchester School of Art in Cavendish Street built in 1880-1 also in the Neo-Gothic style. He designed St Chrysostom's Church which was built between 1874 and 1877 in Victoria Park where he designed Dalton Hall, a university hall of residence, in 1882. All these buildings are designated Grade II Listed buildings by English Heritage.

Gallery of Architectutal Work

References

External links
1873 – Workshops for The Outdoor Blind, Liverpool, Lancashire

1840 births
1912 deaths
19th-century English architects
Gothic Revival architects
Architects from London
Associates of the Royal Institute of British Architects